The Frauen DFB-Pokal 1989–90 was the 10th season of the cup competition, Germany's second-most important title in women's football. In the final which was held in Berlin on 19 May 1990 FSV Frankfurt defeated Bayern Munich 1–0, thus claiming their second cup title.

Participants

First round

Replay

Quarter-finals

Semi-finals

Replay

Final

References 

Fra
DFB-Pokal Frauen seasons